Abu Ismaïl Abdullah al-Harawi al-Ansari or Abdullah Ansari of Herat (1006–1088) also known as Pir-i Herat "Sage of Herat", was a Muslim Sufi saint  who lived in Herat (modern-day Afghanistan).  Ansari was a commentator on the Qur'an, scholar of the Hanbali school of thought (madhhab), traditionalist, polemicist and spiritual master, known for his oratory and poetic talents in Arabic and Persian.

Life
Ansari was born in the Kohandez, the old citadel of Herat, in 1006. His father, Abu Mansur, was a shopkeeper who had spent several years of his youth at Balkh.

Ansari was a disciple of Abu al-Hassan al-Kharaqani. He practised the Hanbali school of Sunni jurisprudence. The Shrine of Khwaja Abd Allah, built during the Timurid dynasty, is a popular pilgrimage site. He excelled in the knowledge of Hadith, history and ʻilm al-ansāb. He wrote several books on Islamic mysticism and philosophy in Persian and Arabic. 

He was one of the first Sufis to write in Persian, which he wrote in a local dialect, thus indicating that he wanted to spread his teachings to the general populace instead of just to the ulama, who knew Arabic.

Ansari's most famous work is "Munajat Namah" (literally  'Litanies or dialogues with God'), which is considered a masterpiece of Persian literature. After his death, many of his sayings recorded in his written works and transmitted by his students were included in the Tafsir of Maybudi, "Kashf al-Asrar" (The Unveiling of Secrets). This was among the earliest complete Sufi Tafsirs (exegesis) of the Quran and has been published several times in 10 volumes.

Ansari was a direct descendant of Abu Ayyub al-Ansari, a companion of the Islamic prophet Muhammad, being the ninth in line from him. The lineage is described, and traced in the family history records, as follows;

Abu Ismail Khajeh Abdollah Ansari, son of Abu Mansoor Balkhi, son of Jaafar, son of Abu Mu'aaz, son of Muhammad, son of Ahmad, son of Jaafar, son of Abu Mansoor al-Taabi'i, son of Abu Ayyub al-Ansari.

In the reign of the third Rashid Caliph, Uthman, Abu Mansoor al-Taabi'i took part in the conquest of Khorasan, and subsequently settled in Herat, his descendant Khwajah Abdullah Ansari died there in 1088.

The Hanbali jurist ibn Qayyim al-Jawziyya wrote a lengthy commentary on a treatise written by Ansari entitled Madarij al-Salikin. He expressed his love and appreciation for Ansari in this commentary with his statement, "Certainly I love the Sheikh, but I love the truth more!". Ibn Qayyim al-Jawziyya refers to Ansari with the honorific title "Sheikh al-Islam" in his work Al-Wabil al-Sayyib min al-Kalim al-Tayyab

Works

Arabic
 Anwar al-Tahqeeq 
 Dhamm al-Kalaam
 Manāzel al-Sā'erīn
 Kitaab al-Frooq
 Kitaab al-Arba'een
 Resala Manaqib Imam Ahmad bin Hanbal (Arabic: رسالة مناقب الإمام أحمد بن حنبل)
 Zad-ul Arefeen (Arabic: زاد االعارفین)

Persian
 Munajat Namah  (Persian: مناجات نامه)
 Nasayeh (Persian: نصایح)
 Kanz-ul Salikeen (Persian: کنز السالکین)
 Haft Hesar (Persian: هفت حصار)
 Elahi Namah (Persian: الهی نامه)
 Muhabbat Namah (Persian: محبت نامه)
 Qalandar Namah (Persian: قلندر نامه)
 Resala-é Del o Jan (Persian: رساله دل و جان)
 Resala-é Waredat (Persian: رساله واردات)
 Sad Maidan  (Persian: صد میدان)

See also

 Firangi Mahal
Khwajgan e Saharanpur
Ansari (Panipat)
 Abu Ayyub al-Ansari
 Ibn Tahir of Caesarea
 Hakim Ahmad Shuja 
 Muhammad Latif Ansari

Further reading
 Stations of the Sufi Path, The One Hundred Fields (Sad Maydan) of Abdullah Ansari of Herat, translated by Nahid Angha www.archetypebooks.com

References

External links

 The Invocations of Abdullah Al Ansari (in English) at archive.org.

1006 births
1088 deaths
Sufi mystics
11th-century Persian-language poets
11th-century writers
People from Herat
11th-century Iranian people
Najjarite people
Atharis
11th-century jurists
Iranian Muslim mystics